The Land of Heroes is a Jorma Kaukonen studio album recorded and released in 1995.  It was his first new solo album since the mid-1980s. The album incorporated the work of several other musicians, including Michael Falzarano, who had joined Hot Tuna and produced remastered versions of Kaukonen's older Relix Records vinyl releases.  Falzarano also produced the new album, and co-wrote some tracks.

Track listing
"Re-Enlisment Blues" (James Jones, Robert Wells, Fred Karger) – 4:09
"Trial by Fire" (Jorma Kaukonen) – 4:02
"Do Not Go Gentle" (Kaukonen) – 3:31
"From the Land of Heroes" (Kaukonen) – 2:52
"It's a God Almighty World" (Michael Falzarano) – 3:36
"Follow the Drinking Gourd" (Traditional) – 4:52
"Banks of the River" (Rev. Gary Davis) – 3:33
"Judge, I'm Not Sorry" (Falzarano) – 4:03
"Dark Train" (Kaukonen, Falzarano) – 5:06
"Have More Faith in Jesus" (Davis) – 2:47

Personnel
Jorma Kaukonen – guitars, vocals, dobro, lap steel guitar
Michael Falzarano – rhythm guitar, mandolin
Fred Bogert – bass, keyboards, vocals
Catheryn Craig – vocals

Production
Michael Falzarano – producer

References

Jorma Kaukonen albums
1995 albums
Relix Records albums